CVK may refer to:
 Central Election Commission of Ukraine
 Central venous catheter
Chiang Rai Witthayakhom School